Fionnuala Ní Flaithbheartaigh was an Gaelic–Irish Lady.

Ní Flaithbheartaigh was married to Burke of Inverin, whose lands were inherited upon his death by his son, Walter Fada Burke. Ní Flaithbheartaigh conspired with her brother, Domhnall mac Ruairi Oge O Flaithbheartaigh, to murder Walter Fada. The killing was carried out by Fionnula and Domnall in 1549, with the castle and lands of Inverin seized by the family. 

Fionnuala's subsequent fate is unknown. Myler, the son of Theobald, son of Walter Fada Burke, was executed after trying to escape from the Galway jail on Mainguard Street in August 1595.

External links
 http://www.ucc.ie/celt/published/T100010B/index.html
 http://www.ucc.ie/celt/online/T100005F/text007.html

References

 'The History of Galway', Sean Spellissy, 1999. 

People from County Galway
16th-century Irish people